Saint Dominic or Dominic de Guzmán was the Roman Catholic founder of the order of Dominicans.

St Dominic or Saint Dominic may also refer to:

People 
 Dominic de la Calzada (1019–1109), Spanish Saint
 Dominic of Silos (1000–1073), Spanish Benedictine Saint
 Dominic Savio (1842–1857), Italian Saint

Churches and monasteries 
 St. Dominic's Church (Bronx, New York)
 St. Dominic's Church, Bahawalpur
 Basilica of St Dominic, Valletta
 St. Dominic Church in San Francisco
 St. Dominic Catholic Church (Washington, D.C.)

Schools

Australia
 St Dominic's College, Penrith, New South Wales

Canada
 Saint Dominic Catholic Secondary School, Bracebridge, Ontario
 St. Dominic Elementary School, Montgomery Place, Saskatoon

India
 St Dominic's Convent English Medium School, Kerala
 St Dominic Savio College, Lucknow, Uttar Pradesh

New Zealand
 St Dominic's College, Henderson, Auckland
 St Dominic's College, Whanganui, Gonville

Portugal
 St Dominic's International School, in Outeiro de Polima, near Lisbon, Portugal

United Kingdom
 St Dominic's Priory School (Stone), Stone, Staffordshire, England
 St Dominic's School, Hambledon, Surrey, England
 St Dominic's Grammar School for Girls, Belfast, Northern Ireland

United States
 St. Dominic Regional High School, Auburn, Maine
 Saint-Dominic Academy, a Catholic grammar school and high school in Lewiston and Auburn, Maine
 St Dominic High School (O'Fallon, Missouri)
 Mount Saint Dominic Academy, a Catholic high school for women in Caldwell, New Jersey
 St Dominic High School (Oyster Bay, New York)
 St Agnes Academy-St Dominic School, Memphis, Tennessee
 St Dominic Savio Catholic High School, North Austin, Texas

Zimbabwe
 St Dominic's Chishawasha, Chishawasha, Zimbabwe

Other uses 
 St Dominic, Cornwall, England

See also 
Domenico
San Domenico (disambiguation)
Domingo (disambiguation)
Santo Domingo, the capital city of the Dominican Republic, formerly the Spanish Captaincy General of Santo Domingo of Hispaniola
Abbey of Santo Domingo de Silos, Santo Domingo de Silos, Burgos, Spain
Santo Domingo Church, Quezon City, Philippines
Domingue (disambiguation)
Saint-Domingue, a former French colony of Hispaniola and the modern-day Republic of Haiti
Dominic (disambiguation)
Dominic
Dominica or the Commonwealth of Dominica, an island country in the Lesser Antilles
Santo Domingo (disambiguation)
St. Dominic High School (disambiguation)
Saint Dominic's Preview, an album by Van Morrison
Domino (comics)

Dominic, St